John Kemp was a Negro league outfielder in the 1920s.

Kemp made his Negro leagues debut in 1920 with the Birmingham Black Barons, and played for the club again in 1923. He went on to play three seasons with the Memphis Red Sox, where he finished his career in 1928.

References

External links
 and Baseball-Reference Black Baseball stats and Seamheads

Place of birth missing
Place of death missing
Year of birth missing
Year of death missing
Birmingham Black Barons players
Memphis Red Sox players
Baseball outfielders